Buffon is a lunar impact crater that is located on the southern hemisphere on the far side of the Moon. It lies a crater diameter south of the large walled plain Chebyshev. To the northeast is the crater Langmuir and to the southwest is Leavitt. Buffon lies nearly at the midpoint between these formations.

This is a worn and eroded crater formation, with a circular rim that can″ still be traced through the rugged terrain but which is irregular and rounded due to a history of lesser impacts. The most notable of these is a tiny crater which lies across the northern rim and the satellite crater Buffon D which lies along the inner eastern wall. The interior floor, although generally level, is equally rugged and irregular, particularly in the eastern half.

Satellite craters
By convention these features are identified on lunar maps by placing the letter on the side of the crater midpoint that is closest to Buffon.

References

External links
 

Impact craters on the Moon